NewDos/80 is a third-party operating system for the Radio Shack TRS-80 line of microcomputers released in 1980. NewDos/80 was developed by Apparat, Inc. of Denver, Colorado. NewDos/80 version 2.0 was released in August 1981. It ran on the TRS-80 Model I and Model III.

Overview
The operating system had additional commands and features that were not available in TRSDOS, the native operating system for TRS-80 computers. NewDos/80 allowed TRS-80 computers to take advantage of advances in floppy disk storage that went beyond the initial 87.5KB 35-track, single-density, single-sided format. The system also corrected issues that early versions of TRSDOS had with arbitrarily losing data due to errors in how it communicated with the contemporary TRS-80 disk drives' 1771 disk controller.

NewDos/80 had many options for specifying specific low-level disk configurations. Settings such as diskette formats, disk drive types, track geometry and controllers could be configured using the PDRIVE command. In version 2.1, Apparat added support for hard disk drives via an external bus adapter.

NewDos/80 was written by Cliff Ide and Jason Matthews. Ide was the primary author of NewDos in all of its incarnations, Matthews wrote "patches" for various applications such as Scripsit and VisiCalc. Ive later retired and Matthews went on to other projects in the software business.

Commands
The following is a list of NewDos/80 commands:

Reception
While criticizing NEWDOS's "nearly incomprehensible documentation", Jerry Pournelle wrote in 1980 that it was "a much better operating system" than the "needlessly complex" TRSDOS and stated that "Tandy ought to be marketing NEWDOS+ themselves".

See also
List of DOS commands
List of Unix commands

References

External links
Mike's Virtual Computer Museum - NEWDOS/80 page
Ira Goldklang's TRS-80 Revived Site - NEWDOS/80 Version 2 reference

Disk operating systems
TRS-80
1980 software